Walter A. Sinz (July 13, 1881 – 1966) was an American sculptor born in Cleveland, Ohio. Among his best-known work was the Thompson Trophy. He was educated at the Cleveland School of Art, where he also taught from 1911 to 1952. In addition to his bronze and medal work, he designed figures for Cowan Pottery.

References

Artists of Our Region from the Cleveland Museum of Art

1881 births
1966 deaths
20th-century American sculptors
20th-century American male artists
American male sculptors
Cleveland School of Art alumni
Sculptors from Ohio
Artists from Cleveland